Aaliyah Wilson (born August 28, 1998) is an American professional basketball player who is currently a free agent. She was selected 11th overall in the 2021 WNBA Draft by the Seattle Storm and was traded to the Fever before the start of the season.

Wilson is a native of Muskogee, Oklahoma. As a player as Muskogee High School, Wilson was named a McDonald's All-American and a Jordan Brand Classic All-American. She participated in Team USA trials in 2016 and 2017.

Wilson started her college career at the University of Arkansas. She transferred to Texas A&M after her freshman season. During her senior season, she received first All-SEC honors for her career, was named to the All-SEC second team as a graduate student and received AP All-American honors. She averaged 10,1 points, 4.7 points, 2 assists, 1.4 steals, and 0.75 blocks with a 41% field goal percentage.

WNBA career statistics

Regular season

|-
| align="left" | 2021
| align="left" | Indiana
| 14 || 0 || 8.5 || .231 || .143 || .500 || 0.9 || 0.6 || 0.2 || 0.1 || 0.6 || 1.1
|-
| align="left" | Career
| align="left" | 1 year, 1 team
| 14 || 0 || 8.5 || .231 || .143 || .500 || 0.9 || 0.6 || 0.2 || 0.1 || 0.6 || 1.1

Arkansas and Texas A&M statistics 

Source

References

External links
 Texas A&M Aggies bio

1998 births
Living people
American women's basketball players
Arkansas Razorbacks women's basketball players
Basketball players from Oklahoma
Indiana Fever players
Seattle Storm draft picks
Sportspeople from Muskogee, Oklahoma
Texas A&M Aggies women's basketball players
21st-century American women